Film in Kansas City possesses a rich heritage and a large film community. Kansas City, Missouri and the surrounding Kansas City Metropolitan Area have often been a locale for Hollywood productions and television programming.

Film heritage
The focus on filmmaking in the Kansas City area more or less began in 1931 when University of Kansas advertising graduate F.O. Calvin founded the Calvin Company in Kansas City. Calvin, an industrial and educational film production company, grew from a small business located in a one-room office to becoming the largest industrial film producer and 16 mm lab in the world during the 1950s and 1960s. Calvin was throughout its life a technical innovator and creative force within the nontheatrical film industry, an early developer of 16 mm release printing and sound-on-film technology, and a prolific producer, winning several hundred film festival awards, until it ceased operations in the early 1980s. In total, by that time, Calvin had produced about 3,000 mostly short films. Calvin made promotional and advertising films for some of the largest Fortune 500 companies in the country, including DuPont, Goodyear Tire, Caterpillar, and General Mills. Calvin's impressively large studio and office headquarters was located at the corner of Truman and Troost roads in Kansas City and many of the company's productions were filmed in and around Kansas City, showing street scenes, local landmarks and activities. However, a great deal of filming was done on-location in other parts of the country or the world, especially in government and educational travelogue film projects.

In addition, local actors and actresses (particularly those with experience in community theater productions, local radio and television) were used by Calvin as actors in their films, and many aspiring, talented young film students and filmmakers from the Kansas City area were employed by Calvin as directors, writers, cameramen, editors, sound operators, etc., etc. Among these local filmmakers were Robert Altman, who was born and raised in Kansas City and who got his first filmmaking experience as a film director at the Calvin Company during the early 1950s. Altman directed about 60 to 65 25-to-30-minute industrial films for the company over a period of five or six years. After leaving the company, Altman produced, wrote, and directed his first feature film, a juvenile delinquency melodrama titled The Delinquents on-location in Kansas City in 1955, using local talent and crews (with the exception of lead actor and Hollywood performer Tom Laughlin, the future "Billy Jack"). It was this film that not only introduced Altman to Hollywood and positioned his foot firmly in Hollywood's door, and grossed $1,000 for distributor United Artists, that also opened people's minds up to possibilities of feature filmmaking in Kansas City. Following The Delinquents, local movie theater exhibitor Elmer Rhoden Jr. produced another film about juvenile delinquency, The Cool and the Crazy in 1958, using mostly local talent and crews once again. The film, with its rabid anti-marijuana message and over-the-top performance by Hollywood lead actor Scott Marlowe has attracted quite a cult following over the past few decades.

That first rapid tide of locally produced feature films ebbed for a while through the 1960s, although in nearby Lawrence, Kansas, industrial filmmaker Herk Harvey produced and directed the cult classic horror film Carnival of Souls. Harvey was a film director for Centron Corporation, a Lawrence-based industrial and educational film production company.

In 1967, Hollywood director Richard Brooks directed a feature film about the murder of the Kansas Clutter family, titled In Cold Blood, and filmed some scenes in and around Kansas City. This was another chance where the local acting talent, usually confined to industrial films, got to appear in feature films. Brooks and crew were very pleased by the outstanding acting talent to be found in Kansas City, and cast several locals in supporting speaking parts.

In the early 1970s, Raquel Welch breezed in through Kansas City to shoot exterior scenes for her exploitation film Kansas City Bomber, and afterwards Kansas City became a center for the production of independent B films and melodramas. Los Angeles producer-director Lamar Card shot the low-budget 1976 movie The Student Body, a "wild youth" film similar to The Delinquents and The Cool and the Crazy, using local talent and city streets as setting for a wild drag race through downtown Kansas City. Hollywood actors and directors involved in film production in Kansas City during the 1970s included Pam Grier, Fred Williamson, Warren Stevens, and Linda Lovelace, and productions filmed in and around Kansas City during the time period included Bird Lives, Mrs. Bridge, Bucktown, and Linda Lovelace for President.

The Day After
In 1982, ABC-TV selected Kansas City as the location for their dramatic and controversial made-for-television film, The Day After, about the aftermath of a Soviet nuclear attack on Kansas City. Jason Robards was the star, and although most of the post-attack action took place in Lawrence, Kansas, several scenes before the blast were filmed on location in Kansas City, and about 100 extras from Kansas City were used. At the end of the film, Robards returns to his home in Kansas City, stumbles through rubble and devastation, and finds his home, having a confrontation with radiation victims taking residence as squatters in the rubble of his house. Director Nicholas Meyer used the demolition site of the old St. Joseph Hospital in Kansas City as the set, and as Robards stumbled through this destruction for the cameras, wearing makeup that made him appear to have lost half his hair from radiation and to have suffered serious flash burns, traffic slowed on the surrounding streets and passers-by strained for a closer look as Robards lifted a human arm from under a fallen building—just the arm, severed at the shoulder. In 1983, The Day After was aired on TV and Americans responded to it soberly and broke down at the thought of a nuclear war.

Recently
Many popular feature films have been produced in Kansas City, including Mr. and Mrs. Bridge (1990); Article 99 (1992); Kansas City (1996), a film about 1930s Kansas City and Kansas City Jazz music, directed by native Robert Altman; Asteroid (1997), which is loosely based in Kansas City; and Ride with the Devil (1999), about the anti-slavery/pro-slavery schism during the Civil War that took place on the Kansas–Missouri border near Kansas City. Recently, the Greater Kansas City Film Commission was founded to encourage producers to film in Kansas City, and the FilmFest Kansas City and Kansas City Filmmakers Jubilee were begun as traditional local festivities.

The latest feature films to come out of Kansas City are CSA: Confederate States of America by Kevin Willmott, which premiered at Sundance, and AIR, a feature-length musical and Raising Jeffry Dahmer written and produced by Wood Dickinson. Wood Dickinson founded Renegade Pictures  to make this film and it was distributed direct to video by Lionsgate as a boxed set special edition. Next upon a distributors request Wood Dickinson wrote and produced Drifter: Henry Lee Lucas starring Antonio Sabato Jr. This film took best actor and actress plus best director at the Beverly Hills film festival. Drifter: Henry Lee Lucas went on to win two Bronze and one Silver Telly Award in the 31st Annual Telly Awards.

In August 2010 Wood Dickinson produced the film Abandoned starring Brittany Murphy. This would be her last starring role before her untimely death. That film went on to garner three Bronze and three Silver Telly Awards in the 32nd Annual Telly Awards.

Renegade's next project was The Perfect Student. This feature was released on 01/17/2012 and stars Natasha Henstridge. The film was featured prominently on the Lifetime channel and went out under the Anchor Bay flag. All of Renegade's films have received both North American and international distribution. Currently, Renegade is working on a documentary.

In television
In 1953, an aspiring 28-year-old Robert Altman, after producing several local television commercials outside of his work for the Calvin Company, turned to television as a new and more wide-open market for his next side project and he and Calvin associate Robert Woodburn shot a dramatic 15-minutes-an-episode anthology series titled The Pulse of the City in Kansas City using Calvin talent and local thespians. They were able to sell the series to the independent DuMont Television Network, who ran it for one season (1953–54).

The show Mama's Family, starring Vicki Lawrence, is often debated to have taken place in the Kansas City suburb of Raytown, Missouri.  Although no state is given in the series, a few cast members made that suggestion. However, Raytown is often referred to as a "city" on the show (the real Raytown is a suburb). More than likely it is a fictional Raytown of an unspecified state.

Shows that are set in Kansas City include UPN's Malcolm & Eddie and ABC Family's Switched at Birth.

Festivals
Kansas City has several major film festivals and many specialty series throughout the year. The longest running festival is FilmFest Kansas City, initiated by the Film Society of Greater Kansas City in 1994. It has the strongest lineup of international films and takes place in the Fall at the Screenland Theater in Kansas City, MO.

The Kansas City Filmmakers Jubilee in April each year at the Tivoli Cinemas in Kansas City, MO began in 1997 as a celebration of independent filmmaking with a focus on the work of Kansas City area filmmakers. The first juried festival, it has awarded over $180,000 in cash and prizes in its first ten years and brought in over 200 visiting film professionals to share their work and insights to the creative process. It has expanded to accept work from all over the world and has developed year-round programming.

The Kansas International Film Festival or KIFF Kansas International Film Festival in Overland Park, KS, formerly known as Halfway to Hollywood, has a strong focus on documentary works and adopts a special focus each year.

The 48 Hour Film Project] came to Kansas City in 2008 and is in its third year and growing in 2010.  The 48 Hour Film Project's mission is to advance filmmaking and promote filmmakers. The oldest and largest timed filmmaking competition, the competition/festival occurs in over 70 cities around the world each year, and encourages filmmakers and would-be filmmakers to get out there and make movies. The tight deadline of 48 hours puts the focus squarely on the filmmakers—emphasizing creativity and teamwork skills. While the time limit places an unusual restriction on the filmmakers, it is also liberating by putting an emphasis on "doing" instead of "talking" and furthermore promotes local filmmakers getting their creative works on the big screen.  The KC:48HFP first took place in 2008 at the Glenwood Arts Theater and returned in 2009 at the Screenland Theater in Kansas City, MO.

Other film events include: Kansas City Urban Film Festival, Electromediascope, Jewish Film Festival, Gay & Lesbian Film Festival, Harvest of Arts Film Festival, Hispanic Film Festival, KAN Film Festival and the Kansas City Fringe Festival.

References 

Culture of Kansas City, Missouri
Kansas
Cinema of Missouri